Bùi Bích Phương (born 1971) was crowned Miss Vietnam in 1988. During this period she was a first year English student at the University of Hanoi. She was the first person ever to be crowned Miss Vietnam. She was one of the shorter contestants and also the youngest contestant to date to be awarded the crown of Miss Vietnam (she was 17 and stood at 5'2" when she won the title). She can also speak fluent English, Korean and Vietnamese.

Miss Viet Nam 1988 
The winner : Bùi Bích Phương
1st runner-up : Nguyễn Thu Mai

External links
Miss Vietnam official website

1971 births
Living people
People from Hanoi
Miss Vietnam winners